is a Japanese manga series by Akira Toriyama and Akira Sakuma. It is a collection of lessons on how to create manga published between October 1982 to March 1984 in Fresh Jump, and collected into a single tankōbon released in May 1985. A sequel called  was written and illustrated by Yusuke Murata from 2008 to 2010 in Weekly Shōnen Jump.

Overview
Hetappi Manga Kenkyūjo is a source of information and advice for any artist who wants to make manga or comics. Everything is clearly explained, associated with Toriyama's humor. Akira Toriyama, as his manga counterpart, Tori-bot, teaches his young assistant Hetappi as well as the readers his techniques to create manga. Hetappi Manga Kenkyūjo explains how to draw, inking, applying frames, create animation effect, onomatopoeia, the basis of characterization and character set, how to proceed for the sake of brevity and clarity of the story, etc. all in a playful atmosphere. The book is divided into four parts.

The essential points listed in Hetappi Manga Kenkyūjo to make a successful manga are: drawing regularly (daily if possible); always start a story with the setting; large bubbles with little text and readable, thumbnails of different sizes, but with an ordered presentation that facilitates the reading order; expressive characters with different looks and personalities, and with a minimum of humor, their position and orientation must remain logical (look towards each other when they speak, fight, etc.); surprise the reader (suspense, unexpected occurrence or action, jokes [open to all], etc.), and always think primarily in reading comfort (step into the shoes of the reader).

Headings

Hetappi Manga Institute
The first and main part, features 12 lessons originally published in Fresh Jump. It explains all the technical aspect, from the narrative aspect to the creation of characters through the technical layout. The professor Tori-bot teaches his pupil Hetappi how to create an identifiable character, how to age a character, the use of perspective, the handling of the pen, sketching, inking Kent paper, editing, layout, and storytelling. In bonus, it gives tips on how to make boards before presenting them to a publisher.

Bird Mountain Manga School
In the second part, the manga artist and co-author Akira Sakuma tells the readers how Toriyama makes his manga. Akira Toriyama is shown at work, and Akira Sakuma, depicted as a little bunny, makes an analysis of Akira Toriyama's style and tells the readers how the author makes his boards. This part is also a detailed description of the tools and other things that have not been introduced yet: what material to use, how to draw a face, creating characters and their personality, painting and inking, applying frames, using onomatopoeia and various effects (speed, close-ups, etc.), the layout of the thumbnails, managing bubbles, a few tips about the characters' actions, the expression of feelings, secrets of gag manga, the adequacy of the action with the layout, and much else.

Hetappi Manga Report
The pedagogical part, is corrections of amateur boards. Akira Toriyama makes an analysis of works aspiring manga artists of all ages sent following the publication of chapters of Hetappi Manga Kenkyūjo in Fresh Jump. He corrects, advises and explains to the young writers how to improve their manga. Toriyama shows the good points, as well as the pitfalls to avoid. The author highlights the fact that a manga creator must necessarily always think to the reader's welfare in the layout, as well as the screenwriting's presentation, to not lose them.

Bonus Part
To conclude the volume, in the fourth part , Toriyama tells the readers how to draw five Dr. Slump characters: Arale Norimaki, Gatchan, Senbei Norimaki, Kinoko Sarada, and Suppaman. This part is in fact a way to bring some additional tips for drawing character's faces.

Trivia
In France, the publisher Glénat had the idea to add the Dragon Ball character Goku on the cover to increase the sale of the French version, which was released on October 22, 1997.
Hellsing author Kouta Hirano said that he learned how to be a manga artist from reading Hetappi Manga Kenkyūjo.

References

External links

1982 manga
Akira Toriyama
Manga creation in anime and manga
Shueisha franchises
Shueisha manga
Shōnen manga